NFPA 1123, subtitled Code for Fireworks Display is a code administered, copyrighted, and published by the National Fire Protection Association (NFPA).  NFPA 1123 is the registered trademark of an American consensus standard which, like many NFPA documents, is systematically revised on a three year cycle.

The standard, despite its title, is not a legal code, it is not published as an instrument of law and has no statutory authority unless adopted by the authority having jurisdiction (AHJ). The standard, widely adopted in the United States, is however deliberately crafted with language suitable for mandatory application to facilitate adoption into law by those empowered to do so.

Document Scope
The scope of the document is described as below on the NFPA website:

"Document Scope:  1.1.1 This code shall apply to the construction, handling, and use of fireworks and equipment intended for outdoor fireworks display. It also shall apply to the general conduct and operation of the display. (See definition 1.4.21, Fireworks Display.) 1.1.2 This code shall not apply to the manufacture, transportation, or storage of fireworks at a manufacturing facility. Similarly, this code shall not apply to the testing of fireworks under the direction of its manufacturer, provided permission for such testing has been obtained from the authority having jurisdiction, which shall be in accordance with NFPA 1124, Code for the Manufacture, Transportation, and Storage of Fireworks and Pyrotechnic Articles. 1.1.3 This code shall not apply to the use of consumer fireworks by the general public. 1.1.4 This code shall not apply to the transportation, handling, or use of fireworks by the armed forces of the United States. 1.1.5 This code shall not apply to the transportation, handling, or use of industrial pyrotechnic devices or fireworks, such as railroad torpedoes, fusees, automotive, aeronautical, and marine flares, and smoke signals. 1.1.6 This code shall not apply to the use of pyrotechnic devices or materials in the performing arts at distances less than those specified in this code and used in conformance with NFPA 1126, Standard for the Use of Pyrotechnics before a Proximate Audience. 1.1.7 This code shall not apply to the use of flame special effects in the performing arts when used in conformance with NFPA 160, Standard for Flame Effects before an Audience. 1.1.8 This code shall not apply to the sale and use of model rockets, model rocket motors, motor reloading kits, pyrotechnic modules, or components used in conformance with NFPA 1122, Code for Model Rocketry, or other propulsion devices as classified by the U.S. Department of Transportation as Rocket Motors (UN0186), or Cartridges, power device (UN0275). 1.1.9 This code shall not apply to the use of explosives, firearms, or flammable special effects used in motion pictures, television, or other entertainment industries."

History
The NFPA 1123 was created to help prevent damage of property and the injury or death of individuals during outdoor firework displays.

Sample Sections
This listing of sections from the 2006 edition shows the scope of the Code.

 General Information
 Referenced Publications
 Definitions
 Requirements for Display Fireworks Aerial Shells & Equipment
 Display Site Selection
 Floating Vessels and Floating Platforms
 Rooftops, Other Structures, and Other Limited Egress Locations
 Operation of the Display
 Qualifications

Editions
2018 
2014 
2010 
2006
2000
1995

Areas using NFPA 1123
Alachua County, Florida
Manatee County, Florida
Palm Coast, Florida
Salt Lake City, Utah

Related or External Links
NFPA 1123 v2010 Booklet on NFPA.org 
NFPA 1123 v2006 Booklet on ConstructionBook.com

See also
National Fire Protection Association
Fire code
Fireworks
Explosives shipping classification system
HAZMAT Class 1 Explosives

References

Safety codes
Pyrotechnics
Explosives
NFPA Standards